Planjsko may refer to:
 Planjsko, Montenegro
 Planjsko, Majšperk, Slovenia